

UCI Road World Rankings

World Championships

UCI World Cup

Source

Single day races (1.1 and 1.2)

Source

Stage races (2.1 and 2.2)
Source

National Championships

UCI teams

References

See also
 2010 in men's road cycling

 
 
Women's road cycling by year